Lahash International is a Christian organization working in East Africa. Lahash works to help vulnerable children in communities affected by war, disease, and corruption. The work is accomplished through partnerships with existing East African churches and ministries that have a vision for serving vulnerable kids in a holistic manner. Lahash currently sponsors 450 children in Uganda, Kenya, Tanzania, and Rwanda.

Child Sponsorship is the primary method of securing long-term international support for the work in East Africa. An office in Portland, Oregon is the headquarters of the organization. The ministry has also created a month-long experiential event called Rice & Beans Month. This month offers an opportunity to the international community to pare back meal budgets for a month in order to share savings with people in East Africa who are facing nutritional shortages.

A book was written in 2011 by Lyla Peterson about the journey of the organization and the partnership with Susan Tabia and her ministry in South Sudan and Uganda to the Sudanese.

History

Lahash was founded by Daniel Holcomb and several friends in 2005. A few years earlier, in 2002, Daniel had visited Northern Uganda and encountered the Amazing Grace Children's Home. The South Sudanese at the home asked Daniel if he would partner with them in their work of serving vulnerable refugee children. He agreed and began to partner with several additional ministries across East Africa.

Over the years Lahash has served many disadvantaged communities. For several years the organization partnered with Mama Margaret Nyabuto at the Tenderfeet School.

Servant Team Program

Lahash facilitates a discipleship and service program each year called Servant Teams. While participating in the program, several young adults enter into a time of classroom learning, serving Portland, Oregon neighborhoods and churches, and serving in East Africa with the ministries that Lahash partners with.

References

External links
Lahash International
Rice & Beans Month
Whispered Prayer
Glowing at a Grassroots Level

International development in Africa
International development agencies